L'Heptade is the third and final album from Harmonium, in which the band made a serious foray into progressive rock. It was released as a double-LP in 1976. It remains one of the best-known popular music double albums in Quebec.

Album description
L'Heptade is composed of seven core songs, in order: Comme un fou (Like a mad man), Chanson noire (Black song), Le premier ciel (The first heaven), L'exil (The exile), Le corridor (The hallway), Lumières de vie (Lights of life), and Comme un sage (Like a wise man). These seven songs were mainly written by the band leader Serge Fiori. The title, heptade, is the compound of two Greek affixes, hept- (seven) and -ade, which expresses both the notion of group (décade, pléiade) and epic movement (as in Iliad).  Fiori mentioned, at the beginning of the live album of L'Heptade, that the album, framed in seven songs, was evoking the journey of a man in one day through seven levels of consciousness; a rapid sigh of a man waking up, followed by steps on a cracked wooden floor can be heard in the prologue, the first musical movement preceding the first core song. A man preparing to sleep can be heard in the finale of the album.

Each of the seven core songs includes from two to six different melodies, often with lengthy solos. Serge Locat performs on synthesizers, especially at the end of "Le premier ciel", and on piano in "Lumières de vie".  The voice of Serge Fiori's falsetto (head voice), sometimes broken by emotion, creates an emotional intimacy. His singing is often counterbalanced by a chorus formed by well-known Quebec singers of the time, including Beau Dommage's Pierre Bertrand, Les Séguin's Richard, and Ville Émard Blues Band's Estelle Ste-Croix. The signature of Harmonium, that is, the rich sound of the 12-string guitar, still remains the backbone of a few songs, particularly in "Comme un fou" and at the end of "Le corridor". But L'Heptade offers a more sophisticated music than in the past. Lush arrangements, creative use of piano, electric piano, and synthesizers, and the sophistication of the melodies are some elements that set this album as full-fledged progressive rock.

The other musical titles listed on the album represent musical interludes of classical, minimalist signature. These interludes are the result of the collaboration between Fiori and classical music composer and teacher Neil Chotem, and are played either by a single synthesizer or with the Orchestre symphonique de Montreal.

The lyrics of the album are mainly based around the personal, inner conflict of the main character. A major theme, recurring in all songs of the album, is the antithesis of the world: the Black and White, the Light and Darkness, the Day and Night. The struggle to unite these antitheses, which the lyrics in the first disc of the double-album, suggest is the source of the character's internal conflict, leads to the realization in the second disc that these antitheses can be overcome through love, but that true appreciation of love appears to be possible only with an uplifting mind. In the original cover of the album, the only printed lyrics were a section of "Lumières de vie", where the character begs to be spoken of love in order to overcome both nights and days (...Lumières de vie... parle-moi d'amour, assez pour éclipser les deux [la nuit, le jour] pour toujours).

Michel Normandeau, the co-founder of Harmonium, left the band at the beginning of the recording of L'Heptade. He thus appears only as contributing to the guitar playing of the first song, as well to the lyrics in many songs of the album.

Production and performance
L'Heptade was recorded in a country house belonging to the Fiori family, in Saint-Césaire. The creaking of the old floor can sometimes be heard on the recordings.
At $90,000, the production of L'Heptade was, at the time, the most expensive ever in the Quebec music industry. While a large part of this amount was provided by a new contract signed with CBS, the musicians still had to contribute to the financing of the production.Big Bang Mag The album was released in 1976.

During the long tour supporting this album, Harmonium was recorded performing in Vancouver which was later edited and published under the name Harmonium en tournée.

The original matrix of the album was thought to have been damaged by a water flood in the offices of CBS. As a consequence, the 1990 CD reissue was done from a vinyl record. However these tapes were later found undamaged and a remixing and remastering project was done by Serge Fiori and Louis Valois and released as L'Heptade XL in November 2016. It was released as lHeptade XL on November 18, 2016 to mark its fortieth anniversary. For the occasion, a new song, called C'est dans le noir, which was recorded at the National Arts Centre in Ottawa during the original tour for the album, has been released on iTunes.

On June 23, 2008 as part of St. Jean Baptiste Day celebrations, Gregory Charles, the Laval Symphony Orchestra, the World Choir, and several singers performed a re-orchestrated version of L'Heptade in Laval, Quebec. Charles had collaborated with Neil Chotem prior to the latter's death.

Reception

The album was (and still is) one of the best-selling double albums in the history of Quebec popular music, selling over 100,000 copies after a few months. Nevertheless, at the time, it had less impact in Quebec than the two previous albums, because of the not-radio-friendly lengthy songs and the sophisticated melodies. Critics largely offered a warm reception to the album, particularly in the world of progressive rock, where it was praised well outside the borders of Quebec. Harmonium was invited to tour with Supertramp in Europe.

L'Heptades popularity grew in the Quebec musical scene, and the album has sold over 400,000 copies since its release.

At the 2017 Polaris Music Prize, the album won the public vote for the Heritage Prize in the 1976-1985 category.

Track listing 
All interludes by Neil Chotem. All music and lead vocals on the remaining tracks by Serge Fiori except where noted. All lyrics by Serge Fiori and Michel Normandeau except where noted.

Side one 
 "Prologue" (interlude) – 4:20
 "Comme un fou" (music: Serge Fiori, Michel Normandeau) – 7:50
 "Sommeil sans rêves" (interlude) – 1:25
 "Chanson noire" – 8:12
 "A. Le Bien, le Mal" (lyrics: Serge Fiori) - 3:39
 "B. Pour une blanche cérémonie" (music: Serge Fiori, Serge Locat) - 4:32

Side two 
 "Le Premier Ciel" – 11:19
 "L'Appel" (Interlude) - 0:10
 "Le Premier Ciel" - 11:09
 "L'Exil" – 12:56
 "Sur une corde raide" (Interlude) - 0:17
 "L'Exil" (lyrics: Serge Fiori) - 12:39

Side three 
 "Le Corridor" - 8:10
 "Le Corridor" (lead vocals: Monique Fauteux) - 6:33
 "Les Premières Lumières" (Interlude) - 1:37
 "Lumières de vie" – 14:12
 "A. Lumières de nuit" - 6:59
 "B. Éclipse" (instrumental) (music: Neil Chotem) - 1:27
 "C. Lumière de jour" (instrumental) (music: Serge Locat) - 3:09
 "D. Lumière de vie" (instrumental) (music: Serge Fiori, Serge Locat, Louis Valois) - 2:38

Side four 
 "Comme un sage" – 14:04
 "Prélude d'amour" (Interlude) - 0:41
 "Comme un sage" (lyrics: Serge Fiori) (lead vocals: Serge Fiori and Estelle Ste-Croix) - 13:23
 "Épilogue" (interlude) – 2:50

Certifications

References

External links
L’Heptade XL website

1976 albums
Harmonium (band) albums
Concept albums